Jama'are is a Local Government Area of Bauchi State, Nigeria. Its headquarters are in the town of Jama'are. It has an area of 493 km and a population of 176,883 at the 2006 census.
The postal code of the area is 751. 
It is populated by a Fulani tribe that migrated from Dulare in the Lake Chad basin in the Republic of Chad.

Understand 
Jamaare has an estimated population of 165,100 and occupies an area of 341.6 km². Most of the inhabitants of Jama′are are members of the Fulani, Shirawa, Kanuri, or Hausa peoples but Fulani is the most prominent tribe in the area. The commonly spoken languages in the area is Hausa and the Fufulde languages while the religions of Islam and Christianity are widely practiced in Jamaare. Jamaare is the hosts of  Bauchi state University’s faculty of Agriculture, General Hospital Jamaare and Jamaare Emirate. There is also a primary teacher-training college and a leprosy clinic in the town. It is made up of a number of towns and villages which include Dogon, Jeji, Hanafari, Galdimari and Jurara.

History 
Traditionally founded in 1811 by Muhammadu Wabi I, a leader in the Fulani jihad (holy war) led by Usman dan Fodio, the emirate was not officially recognized until 1835, when Sambolei, the chief of the Jama’are Fulani, was rewarded with it for his aid against the Hausa rebels of Katsina by Muḥammad Bello, the sarkin musulmi (“commander of the faithful”) and sultan of Sokoto. Emir Muhammadu Maude built the walls (20 feet [6 m] high with four gates) of Jamaare town in the 1850s, but the town barely survived attacks by the forces of Emir Buhari of Hadejia in the 1850s and 1860s. Jamaare’s emir Muhammadu Wabi II submitted to the British after the fall of Kano city to the latter in 1903. Incorporated into the Katagum division of Kano province, Jamaare was transferred to Bauchi province in 1926 and became part of Bauchi state in 1976.

Climate 
It has an average temperature of 31 °C. The popular Jamaare river flows through the LGA with average humidity level of the area put at 41 percent. The rainy season is hot, oppressive, and mostly cloudy and the dry season is sweltering and partly cloudy. The average wind speed in Jamaare LGA is estimated at 12 km/h.

Agriculture 
Farming is the major economic activity of the people of Jamaare and crops such as cotton, cowpea, peanuts (groundnuts), cotton, sorghum, millet, and onions, cowpeas, and vegetables are being cultivated in the area. They also rear animals such domestic animals like goats, rams, cattle, sheep, donkeys, and horses. Other important economic enterprises undertaken by the people of Jamaare are trade, hunting, and the weaving and dyeing of cotton.

Education
The Federal College of Education Jama'are was founded in 2020.

References

Local Government Areas in Bauchi State